General Sir Samuel Benjamin Auchmuty  (28 April 1780 – 30 April 1868) was an Anglo-Irish soldier.

Military career
He was the second son of Col. Samuel Auchmuty and his wife, Elizabeth Domvile Savage, only daughter of Francis Savage. Auchmuty entered the British Army as ensign in 1797 and served first in the French Revolutionary Wars and subsequently in the Napoleonic Wars. He was lieutenant of the 68th Regiment of Foot in 1800 and was promoted to captain in 1805. A year later Auchmuty was transferred to the 70th Regiment of Foot and in 1807 to the 7th Regiment of Foot. In 1810, he was appointed deputy assistant adjutant-general and attached to the 6th Infantry Division. He became Aide-de-camp to Sir Galbraith Lowry Cole in July 1813 and was promoted to major in October of the same year. Auchmuty fought in the Battle of Orthez in February 1814 and in the Battle of Toulouse in April, for which he received the Army Gold Medal and was made a brevet lieutenant-colonel.

Auchmuty became colonel in 1831 and major-general 1841. He was transferred to the general staff in India in 1848, became colonel of the 65th Regiment of Foot in February 1851 was promoted to lieutenant-general in November. In 1855, Auchmuty was appointed colonel of his old regiment, the 7th foot, and following the death of Sir Robert John Harvey was promoted finally to general in 1860. He was awarded a Knight Commander of the Order of the Bath in 1857 and a Knight Grand Cross in 1861.

In 1817, he married Mary Anne Buchanan. Auchmuty died, aged 88 at Pau, Pyrénées-Atlantiques.

Arms

References

External links
 Samuel Benjamin Gravestone on display at the Urban Cemetery of Pau (the gravesite is defunct)

1780 births
1868 deaths
Knights Grand Cross of the Order of the Bath
Recipients of the Army Gold Medal
Military personnel from Newry
British Army generals
British Army personnel of the French Revolutionary Wars
British Army personnel of the Napoleonic Wars
68th Regiment of Foot officers
Royal Fusiliers officers